Norman Penrose (10 March 1922 – 2000) was an English professional footballer who played as a wing half.

References

1922 births
2000 deaths
Sportspeople from Consett
Footballers from County Durham
English footballers
Association football wing halves
Medomsley Juniors F.C. players
Grimsby Town F.C. players
English Football League players